The Sugut River is a river in Sandakan Division, northeastern Sabah of Malaysia. Its source is originated from the mountains in the eastern slopes of Mount Kinabalu National Park in Ranau District, which part of the Mount Kinabalu system.

Conservation efforts 
Some of the distinctive features of the Sugut River landscape include the dry land forest on sandstone hills, riverine forests and oxbow lakes, where it become the natural breeding ground for an abundance of wildlife, including macaques, mousedeer, muntjac, orangutan, proboscis monkeys, sambar deer, silvered langurs, sun bear, wild pig as well as variety of bird species, including 43 species of freshwater fish. The Trusan Sugut of the river mouth is part of the Sugut Conservation Area (SCA), which was initially gazetted as a Class II commercial forest and later reclassified as a Class I Protection Forest on 24 December 2014. In 2015, the World Wide Fund for Nature (WWF) recording the importance of the waterway for villagers as part of a three-year freshwater ecosystem conservation project of the WWF.

Features 
The river flows from the Mount Kinabalu system through an extensive alluvial plain before arriving at the Sulu Sea. Along the river also located the Trusan Sugut Forest Reserve.

See also 
 List of rivers of Malaysia

References

Further reading

External links 
 

Rivers of Sabah
Nature sites of Malaysia
Rivers of Malaysia